Konar Siah or Konarsiyah or Konar-e Siah, or Kenar Sayeh or Konar-e Seyah may refer to:
 Konar Siah, Bandar Abbas, Hormozgan Province
 Konar-e Siah, Bastak, Hormozgan Province
 Konar Siah, Qeshm, Hormozgan Province